Al Rayyan Futsal Team is part of Al Rayyan Sports Club in Qatar. It is based in Umm Al Afaei, Al Rayyan. The team was founded in 2006. Since the Qatar professional futsal league started in 2006/2007, Al Rayyan were the main force in Qatar. They won the first Qatar professional league when it first started in 2006/2007. Al Rayyan won the first Qatar Association Cup in 2008/2009, beating Qatar SC 7–5 in the final. In addition to the first league and cup titles, Al Rayyan secured the first Qatar Futsal Super Cup in 2010/2011 after beating Al Sadd 3–2 in a thrilling encounter.
In the first time in the history of futsal in Qatar, the winner of the league would be decided by a play-off. Al Rayyan subsequently won their third league title by beating Al Gharafa 3–2 and 4–3 in both final games sealing their second consecutive league title.

Al Rayyan hosted the second AFC champions league tournament during 26-6-2011 and 1-7-2011. 
In May 2011 Al Rayyan signed two Iranian international stars on loan from Foolad Mahan to participate in the AFC Champions League 2011: Mohammad Taheri (the best Asian player in 2010) and Ali Hassanzadeh.

The team finished fourth, losing in the semi finals to Shahid Mansouri from Iran 6–5 after extra time in a controversial match. Al Rayyan got the Fair Play Award and Ali Hassanzadeh won the tournament top scorer with 10 goals.

Season to season

Former head coaches
  Hassan Rhouila 2006–2007
  Adil Sayeh 2007
  Dževad Habibija 2007-2008
  Hassan Rhouila 2008-2011
  Juanito 2011–2012

Club honours
 3 Qatar League (2006–2007) (2009–2010) (2010–2011)
 1 Qatar Association Cup  (2008–2009)
 1 Qatar Super Cup (2010–2011)

References

External links
 Official website 

Al-Rayyan SC
Futsal clubs in Qatar
Futsal clubs established in 2006
2006 establishments in Qatar